Events in the year 1863 in Portugal.

Incumbents
Monarch: Louis I
Prime Minister: Nuno José Severo de Mendoça Rolim de Moura Barreto, 1st Duke of Loulé

Events

Arts and entertainment

Sports

Births

14 January – Manuel de Oliveira Gomes da Costa, military officer and politician (died 1929)
28 September – Carlos I of Portugal, king (died 1908).

Deaths

References

 
1860s in Portugal
Years of the 19th century in Portugal
Portugal